Rushville is an unincorporated community in Susquehanna County, Pennsylvania, United States. Rushville had a post office until October 5, 2002.

References

Unincorporated communities in Susquehanna County, Pennsylvania
Unincorporated communities in Pennsylvania